The following is a list of the exports of Poland.

Exports of Poland
Data is for 2012, in millions of United States dollars, as reported by The Observatory of Economic Complexity. Currently the top twenty exports are listed.

References

Poland
Foreign trade of Poland
Exports